Walter Maurer may refer to:

* Walter Maurer (wrestler) (1893–1983), American wrestler 
 Walter Maurer (artist) (born 1942), German designer and university lecturer